The  is an AC electric multiple unit train type operated on local services by Kyushu Railway Company (JR Kyushu) in Japan since 1994.

Design
The trains were built jointly by Kinki Sharyo and JR Kyushu (at its Kokura factory).

Variants
 813-0 series: 9 x 3-car sets RM001to RM009
 813-100 series: 19 x 3-car sets RM101 to RM113 RG114 to RG119
 813-200 series: 36 x 3-car sets RM201 to RM227 RG228 RM229 to RM236
 813-300 series: 3 x 3-car sets RM301 to RM303
 813-1000 series: 3 x 3-car sets RM1001 RG1002, RG1003
 813-1100 series: 15 x 3-car sets RM1101 to RM1115

813-0 series
Nine sets (R001 to R009) were delivered to Minami-Fukuoka depot in 1994, originally as two-car sets, entering service from 1 March 1994.

From March 2003, new 10th-batch SaHa 813-400 centre cars were added to standardize the entire fleet as three-car sets.

These sets are normally used on the Kagoshima Main Line, Nippō Main Line, Nagasaki Main Line, and Sasebo Line.

Two-car set R008 was withdrawn together with R101 and R231 after sustaining damage in a head-on collision in February 2002.

Formation

The KuHa 813 car is fitted with one PS400K scissors-type pantograph, and has a toilet. The SaHa 813 car is fitted with a wheelchair space.

813-100 series

Thirteen 2nd-batch 813-100 series three-car sets (R101 to R113) were delivered to Minami-Fukuoka depot between January 1995 and March 1996. Six two-car sets (R014 to R019) were delivered to Nōgata depot between January and May 1996. These differ from the Minami-Fukuoka sets in having black cab ends. The two-car sets were lengthened to three cars in October 2001 with the addition of 8th-batch SaHa 813-500 centre trailer cars. These cars have longitudinal seating.

The Minami-Fukuoka-based sets are normally used interchangeably with the 813-0 series sets, and the Nōgata-based sets are normally used on the Fukuhoku Yutaka Line.

Set R101 was withdrawn together with R008 and R231 after sustaining damage in a head-on collision in February 2002.

Formations

Minami-Fukuoka sets R102 to R113

The KuHa 813 car is fitted with one PS400K scissors-type pantograph, and has a toilet.

Nōgata sets R014 to R019

The KuHa 813 car is fitted with one PS400K scissors-type pantograph, and has a toilet.

813-200 series

36 three-car 813-200 series sets (R201 to R236) were delivered to Minami-Fukuoka depot between March 1997 and September 1998 to provide increased capacity and replace ageing 423 series and 715 series electric multiple units on the Kagoshima Main Line.

One set, R228, was transferred to Nōgata depot in October 2001, coinciding with the electrification of the Fukuhoku Yutaka Line. This set was repainted with black ends, and is used interchangeably with the Nōgata-based 813-100 series sets.

Set R231 was withdrawn together with R008 and R101 after sustaining damage in a head-on collision in February 2002.

Formation

The KuHa 813 car is fitted with one PS400K scissors-type pantograph, and has a toilet.

Interior

813-300 series

Three 9th-batch 813-300 series three-car sets (R301 to R303) were delivered to Minami-Fukuoka depot in February 2003 to replace the three sets (R008, R101, R231) withdrawn following a collision in 2002. These new sets feature universal access toilets, and tinted glass windows. They are normally used interchangeably with the 813-200 series sets.

Formation

The KuHa 813 car is fitted with one PS400K scissors-type pantograph, and has a toilet and wheelchair space.

813-1000 series
Three 11th-batch 813-1000 series three-car sets (R1001 to R1003) were delivered to Minami-Fukuoka depot in March 2005. These new sets feature VVVF inverter control.

Formation

The KuHa 813 car has a toilet and wheelchair space. The MoHa 813 car is fitted with one PS401K single-arm pantograph.

813-1100 series

Six 12th-batch 813-1100 series 3-car sets (R1101 to R1106) were delivered to Minami-Fukuoka depot in February 2007, followed by nine 13th-batch sets (R1107 to R1115) in September 2009. These new sets feature LED destination indicators, with a redesigned front end. The new 13th-batch sets were configured for wanman driver only operation while the earlier 12th-batch sets were modified for driver only operation between June 2009 and February 2010.

Sets R1105 and R1106 were temporarily renumbered R2105 and R2106 to distinguish them from other sets in the fleet modified for driver only operation, and were returned to their original numbers in 2010 following conversion.

Formation

The KuHa 813 car has a toilet and wheelchair space. The MoHa 813 car is fitted with one PS401K single-arm pantograph.

Interior

References

External links

 Kinki Sharyo 813 series details 

Electric multiple units of Japan
Kyushu Railway Company
Train-related introductions in 1994
20 kV AC multiple units
Kinki Sharyo multiple units